Giuseppe Boffa (Milan, 23 July 1923 - Rome, 13 September 1998 ) was an Italian journalist, historian and politician. He took part in World War II resistance movement, joined the Italian Communist Party and used to work for Italian Communist newspaper, l'Unità and wrote on Soviet history. His work, the History of Soviet Union, published in 1976, influenced leaders of the Soviet Union, such as Mikhail Gorbachev. His works won Viareggio Prize.

References

1923 births
1998 deaths
Italian male journalists
20th-century Italian male writers
Politicians from Milan
20th-century Italian historians
Italian Communist Party politicians
20th-century Italian journalists
Italian resistance movement members
Journalists from Milan
Senators of Legislature X of Italy
Viareggio Prize winners
Historians of the Soviet Union
L'Unità editors
Democrats of the Left politicians